Rubro Social Esporte Clube, commonly known as Rubro Social, is a Brazilian football club based in Araruama, Rio de Janeiro state.

History
The club was founded on August 30, 1991, after the merger of Rubro Atlético Clube and Clube de Xadrez. Rubro Social won the Copa do Interior in 1996, after beating Mesquita in the final.

Achievements

 Copa do Interior:
 Winners (1): 1996

Stadium
Rubro Social Esporte Clube play their home games at Estádio Mário Castanho. The stadium has a maximum capacity of 7,000 people.

References

Association football clubs established in 1991
Football clubs in Rio de Janeiro (state)
1991 establishments in Brazil